The medical model of disability, or medical model, is based in a biomedical perception of disability. This model links a disability diagnosis to an individual's physical body. The model supposes that this disability may reduce the individual's quality of life and aims to diminish or correct this disability with medical intervention. It is often contrasted with the social model of disability.

The medical model focuses on curing or managing illness or disability. By extension, the medical model supposes a "compassionate" or just society invests resources in health care and related services in an attempt to cure or manage disabilities medically. This is in an aim to expand functionality and/or improve functioning, and to allow disabled persons a more "normal" life. The medical profession's responsibility and potential in this area is seen as central.

History 
Before the introduction of the biomedical model, patients relaying their narratives to the doctors was paramount. Through these narratives and developing an intimate relationship with the patients, the doctors would develop treatment plans in a time when diagnostic and treatment options were limited. This could particularly be illustrated with aristocratic doctors treating the elite during the 17th and 18th century.

In 1980, the World Health Organization (WHO) introduced a framework for working with disability, publishing the "International Classification of Impairments, Disabilities and Handicaps". The framework proposed to approach disability by using the terms Impairment, Handicap and Disability.
 Impairment = a loss or abnormality of physical bodily structure or function, of logic-psychic origin, or physiological or anatomical origin
Disability = any limitation or function loss deriving from impairment that prevents the performance of an activity in the time lapse considered normal for a human being
Handicap = the disadvantaged condition deriving from impairment or disability limiting a person performing a role considered normal in respect of age, sex and social and cultural factors

Components and usage 
While personal narrative is present in interpersonal interactions, and particularly dominant in Western Culture, personal narrative during interactions with medical personnel is reduced to relaying information about specific symptoms of the disability to medical professionals. The medical professionals then interpret the information provided about the disability by the patient to determine a diagnosis, which likely will be linked to biological causes. Medical professionals now define what is "normal" and what is "abnormal" in terms of biology and disability.

In some countries, the medical model of disability has influenced legislation and policy pertaining to persons with disabilities on a national level.

The International Classification of Functioning, Disability and Health (ICF), published in 2001, defines disability as an umbrella term for impairments, activity limitations and participation restrictions. Disability is the interaction between individuals with a health condition (such as cerebral palsy, Down syndrome and depression) and personal and environmental factors (such as negative attitudes, inaccessible transportation and public buildings, and limited social supports). 

The altered language and words used show a marked change in emphasis from talking in terms of disease or impairment to talking in terms of levels of health and functioning. It takes into account the social aspects of disability and does not see disability only as a 'medical' or 'biological' dysfunction. That change is consistent with widespread acceptance of the social model of disability.

Criticism

The medical model focuses on individual intervention and treatment as the proper approach to disability. Emphasis is placed on the disability rather than the systems and structures that inhibit the lives of people with disabilities. Under the medical model, disabled bodies are depicted as deviant, pathological, and defective, thus, best understood in medical terms. The history and future of disability are severely constricted, focusing solely on medical implications and ignoring very real social constructions contributing to the experience of disability. Alternatively, the social model presents disability less as an objective fact of the body and mind, and positions it in terms of social relations.

Among advocates of disability rights, who tend to subscribe to the social model instead, the medical model of disability is often cited as the basis of an unintended social degradation of disabled people. Resources are seen as excessively misdirected towards an almost-exclusively medical focus when those same resources could potentially be used towards things like universal design and societal inclusionary practices. This includes the monetary and societal costs and benefits of various interventions, be they medical, surgical, social or occupational, from prosthetics, drug-based and other "cures", and medical tests such as genetic screening or preimplantation genetic diagnosis. According to disability rights advocates, the medical model of disability is used to justify large investment in these procedures, technologies and research, when adaptation of the disabled person's environment could potentially be more beneficial to the society at large, as well as financially cheaper and physically more attainable.

Also, some disability rights groups see the medical model of disability as a civil rights issue and criticise charitable organizations or medical initiatives that use it in their portrayal of disabled people, because it promotes a pitiable, essentially negative, largely disempowered image of people with disabilities rather than casting disability as a political, social and environmental problem (see also the political slogan "Piss On Pity").

See also
 Cure
 Medical model of autism
 Medicalization
 Models of deafness
 Neurodiversity

References

External links 
The Open University: Making your teaching inclusive: The Medical Model

Disability
Medical sociology
Medical models
Sociological theories
Social theories